Mario Zampi (1 November 19032 December 1963) was an Italian film producer and director. A co-founder of Two Cities Films, a British production company, he is most closely associated with British comedies of the 1950s.

Biography

Zampi began his career as an actor in Italy at the age of 17. By 1930, he was working for Warner Bros. as a film editor in London. In 1937, he and compatriot Filippo Del Giudice founded Two Cities Films. While the company was noted for such serious films as In Which We Serve, Henry V, and Hamlet, Zampi is most remembered for comedies. He made his mark with such films as Laughter in Paradise (1951), The Naked Truth (1957), and Too Many Crooks (1959), often in the dual role of director and producer.

Filmography
Director and producer unless otherwise indicated.

Tredici uomini e un cannone (1936) producer
13 Men and a Gun (1938)
French Without Tears (1940) producer
Spy for a Day (1940)
Freedom Radio aka A Voice in the Night (1941) producer (uncredited)
The Phantom Shot (1947)
Third Time Lucky (1948) producer
The Fatal Night (1948)
The Happiest Days of Your Life (1950) producer
Shadow of the Past (1950)
Come Dance with Me (1950)
Laughter in Paradise (1951)
Top Secret, aka Mr. Potts Goes to Moscow (1952)
 I Chose Love aka Ho scelto l'amore (1953) director
Happy Ever After, aka Tonight's the Night (1954)
Now and Forever (1956)
The Naked Truth, aka Your Past Is Showing (1957)
Too Many Crooks (1959)
Bottoms Up (1960)
Five Golden Hours, aka Cinque ore in contanti (1961) director

References

Kay Weniger. Das große Personenlexikon des Films, Schwarzkopf & Schwarzkopf Verlag, Berlin 2001,

External links

Biography at britmovie.co.uk

Italian film directors
Italian film producers
1903 births
1963 deaths
Italian emigrants to the United Kingdom